D. Pattuswamy Mudaliar is an Indian politician, textile merchant and former Member of parliament, Lok Sabha from Vandavasi constituency as an Indian National Congress (I) candidate in 1980 election. He was born in Kaikolar family in Tiruvannamalai district.

References 

Possibly living people
Year of birth missing
Indian National Congress politicians from Tamil Nadu